Andrea Heidi Seastrand (née Ciszek; born August 5, 1941) is a former one-term Republican member of the United States House of Representatives, serving from 1995 to 1997.

Personal life 
Seastrand was born Andrea Heidi Ciszek in Chicago. She graduated from DePaul University in 1963 with a B.A. in education, and then moved to Salinas, California to find work as an elementary school teacher. In 1965, she married Eric Seastrand, a stockbroker, and the couple had two children named Kurt and Heidi.

Political career 
From 1982 to 1990, when her husband served in the California State Assembly as a Republican, Seastrand joined the California Federation of Republican Women, later becoming its president.

In 1990, Eric Seastrand died of cancer, and Andrea won a special election to succeed him, receiving 65 per cent of the vote. She remained a member of assembly for the next four years, serving on the education committee and as assistant minority leader.

Seastrand was elected to the U.S. House of Representatives in 1994, narrowly defeating Theology professor Walter Capps and succeeding fellow Republican Michael Huffington. Considered one of the more conservative members of the 104th Congress, she faced Capps again in 1996 and was defeated.

Post-political work 
In 1997, after her departure from Congress, Seastrand founded the California Space and Technology Alliance—a private nonprofit focused on promoting California's participation in space ventures—which later became the California Space Authority. She remained executive director of the organization from its creation until its dissolution in 2011.

See also
 Women in the United States House of Representatives

References

External links

 
 Andrea Seastrand-JoinCalifornia.com

1941 births
Living people
Republican Party members of the California State Assembly
DePaul University alumni
Politicians from Chicago
Female members of the United States House of Representatives
Women state legislators in California
Republican Party members of the United States House of Representatives from California
Spouses of California politicians
21st-century American women